The Treaty of Prairie du Chien may refer to any of several treaties made and signed in Prairie du Chien, Wisconsin between the United States, representatives from the Sioux, Sac and Fox, Menominee, Ioway, Winnebago and the Anishinaabeg (Chippewa, Ottawa and Potawatomi) Native American peoples.

Description

Due to the overall tribal movements toward the western direction under pressure of encroaching settlers, the Sioux Nation resisted and came into conflict with other tribes moving west into their traditional territory. The United States negotiated the treaty to try to reduce inter-tribal warfare.  

The treaty begins by establishing peace between the Sioux and their neighbors: Chippewa, Sac and Fox, and Ioway peoples. The treaty continues by demarcating formal boundaries among each of the tribal groups, often called the "Prairie du Chien Line". The treaty claimed American sovereignty over the territories. For peoples accustomed to ranging over a wide area, the Prairie du Chien Line served as a hindrance, as it provided that tribes were to hunt only within their acknowledged limits. Due to the vast scope of the Treaty of Prairie du Chien and the fact that not all of the necessary tribes had representatives at its signing, the treaty provided for additional councils to be held the following year in 1826 (see Treaty of Fond du Lac).  Along with these additional councils, the Chippewa agreed to additional meetings.

The US used the series of Prairie du Chien Lines to serve as the land cession boundaries in later treaties.

See also 
 Treaty of St. Louis (1804)
 Treaty of St. Louis (1816)
 Treaty of St. Louis (1818)
 Treaty of St. Louis (1825)
 Treaty of Chicago

References

External links 

Text of the 1825 Treaty

History of Illinois
Pre-statehood history of Iowa
Pre-statehood history of Minnesota
Pre-statehood history of Wisconsin
Prairie du Chien
1825 treaties
Prairie du Chien, Wisconsin